Sammy Tinkerbell Dobson (born 27 November 1986)  is a British actress. Born in Newcastle-upon-Tyne, she appeared as 'Sarah Young' in the children's drama series Byker Grove, that was set in the city, from 2001-2005. She was subsequently in episodes of several British television shows, including Casualty, Inspector George Gently and Doctors.

From 2007 to 2009, Dobson was a regular member of the team as part of the zoo format Stephen Merchant show on BBC 6Music. In 2010 she starred in the ITV TV movie Joe Maddison's War, as well as having roles in the films Public Sex (2009) and Almost Married (2014). She had an appearance alongside Peter Andre in an advert for Iceland. In 2016, she had a recurring role in the sitcom Boy Meets Girl, and had a minor part in the film I, Daniel Blake.

Dobson began trying comedy aged 23, being inspired to do so having survived a serious car accident. She has since performed sketch and stand-up comedy around Newcastle, and visited the Edinburgh Fringe Festival in 2015  and 2016. In 2016, she launched a podcast, entitled Which Is The Best?, alongside fellow Tyneside comedian Lee Kyle.

References

British television actresses
English radio DJs
Male actors from Newcastle upon Tyne
Living people
1986 births
British radio presenters
British women radio presenters